Burlington-Edison School District No. 100 is a public school district in Skagit County, Washington, USA and serves the communities of Alger, Bow, Burlington and Edison.

Schools

High schools
Burlington-Edison High School

Primary schools
Allen Elementary School
Bay View Elementary School
Edison Elementary School
Lucille Umbarger Elementary School
West View Elementary School

Alternative schools
Burlington North

References

External links

Burlington-Edison School District Report Card

School districts in Washington (state)
Education in Skagit County, Washington